Tuncurry is a coastal town in the Mid North Coast region of New South Wales, Australia, in the Mid-Coast Council LGA, about  north north east of Sydney. It is immediately adjacent to its twin town of Forster, which is the larger of the two towns.

This number grows considerably in the tourist season. The population of Tuncurry alone was 6,186.

History
In 1875, John Wright was the first white settler in Tuncurry. The first land grant in this area was in 1875. The settlement was originally called North Shore and then North Forster and was renamed Tuncurry meaning "plenty of fish" in 1891 and then proclaimed a village in 1893.

The area was well known in the early days for its timber cutting and sawmills. Timber was collected from the lakes and rivers by the logpunts (droghers).

A bridge over the Coolongolook River that marks the entrance to Wallis Lake was built in 1959 linking Forster and Tuncurry and replacing the punt service that had operated since 1890.

Tourism 
Because of its close driving proximity to Sydney, Forster-Tuncurry has established itself as a popular summer holiday destination, where in the hotter months, the population swells considerably. The school holidays in the colder months also bring large numbers of holidaymakers.

Tuncurry's Nine Mile Beach is a popular swimming, surfing and fishing spot. Tuncurry Rockpool is a netted swimming enclosure, formed by breakwalls which mark the entrance to Wallis Lake. Tuncurry's lakefront areas are characterised by wharves and jetties which provide mooring for fishing boats and pleasure craft.

Sporting Clubs 

 The Tuncurry Golf Course is part of the Forster Tuncurry Golf Club
 The Tuncurry Forster Football Club is a soccer club home to the Tuncurry Tigers
 The Forster Tuncurry Rugby League Football Club is home to the Forster Tuncurry Hawkes
 The Tuncurry Forster Jockey Club has regular horse racing events
 The Forster Tuncury Touch Association offers touch football for all levels
 The Tuncurry Beach Bowling Club offers lawn bowling to the area

See also
 Wallamba River

Gallery

References

External links

 Forster-Tuncurry Visitor Guide - www.Tuncurry.com.au
 MidCoast Council

Towns in the Hunter Region
Suburbs of Mid-Coast Council
Coastal towns in New South Wales